Kwality Ltd. is a processor and handler of dairy products in India listed on Bombay Stock exchange as public Limited Company. The company produces various types of dairy products, which include milk, ghee, butter, milk powder, curd, yogurt, cheese etc. The company has established procurement network which comprise 350,000 farmer families across 4,700 villages in North India. Kwality Ltd. has six plants in Haryana, Uttar Pradesh and Rajasthan with processing capacity of  milk per day.

History 

Kwality Ltd. was incorporated in 1992 as Kwality Dairy (India) Ltd and registered with the registrar of companies (West Bengal) at Calcutta. In 1995 the company started producing ghee, skimmed milk powder and other dairy products. The total cost of the above project was 36 billion rupees; it was financed by way of public issue.

In 2013, Kwality Dairy India Ltd was changed from Kwality Dairy (India) Limited to Kwality Limited.

In Dun & Bradstreet Corporate Award 2014, Kwality Limited was selected as the top Indian Company under the ‘Food & Agro processing’ sector.

In June 2016, Kwality Ltd. secured the investment of 5.2 billion rupees from KKR India.

In October 2019, Haldiram made a 1.3 billion rupee bid for Kwality Dairy (India) Ltd after private equity giant KKR & Co. dragged dairy firm to bankruptcy court.

On 21 September 2020, Kwality Limited was charged with cheating a group of banks of ₹ 1,400 crore in a case of fraud filed by the Central Bureau of Investigation. The CBI started its investigations on a complaint by Bank of India, which alleged that Kwality Ltd had taken credit from the bank since 2010 but started defaulting on payments in early 2018.

Brands and subsidiaries 
The company sells milk under the brand Kwality Milk, which is available in three variants: Full Cream, Toned & Double Toned.
It also sells ready to drink Flavoured Milk, Dahi, Chaach etc. It is the first company in India to launch fortified flavoured milk with vitamin A+D in multiple flavours like Kesar, Badam, Elaichi, Butterscotch and Cold Coffee.

Products 

The product range of the company includes skimmed milk powder, whole milk powder, dairy whitener, dairy mix, ice cream mix, ready to drink milk, and ghee among other products.

Advertising 

The company had signed up the actor Akshay Kumar as a brand ambassador in October 2015 for two years, according to a BSE filing.

In September 2017, the company confirmed the reappointment of Akshay Kumar as its brand ambassador for another two years. Kwality Limited came out with a campaign for its brand of milk, ‘Kwality’. The TVC campaign was conceptualized by McCann Health, India and it featured Akshay Kumar.

References 

Dairy products companies of India
Catering and food service companies of India
Companies based in Kolkata
Indian companies established in 1992
Food and drink companies established in 1992
Manufacturing companies established in 1992
1992 establishments in West Bengal